Polisportiva S.S. Lazio Rugby 1927, based in Rome, is an Italian rugby union team. They currently play in Top12 after gaining promotion from winning Serie A in the 2009–10 season.

It is the rugby union branch of the multisport club S.S. Lazio, probably the biggest European multisport organization, which operates also the famous association football team with the same name.

They were the first XV in Italy established in Rome in 1927, as “S.S. Lazio Rugby”, the rugby section of Lazio Sports Association.
The founders were the brothers Vinci: Eugenio (Vinci I), Paolo (Vinci II), Francesco (Vinci III) and Pietro (Vinci IV).
The Oval eagles debuted on 13 May 1928 at Rome's National Stadium (demolished and rebuilt in the 1950s as Stadio Flaminio) in front of 20,000 spectators. S.S. Lazio Rugby defeated “XV Legione Leonessa d'Italia” by a score of 17-0.

They play their home games at the Giulio Onesti Olimpic Preparation Center of Acqua Acetosa, in the Parioli district.

Honours
 Italian championship
 Runners-up (1): 1928–29
 Excellence Trophy
 Runners-up (2): 2011–12, 2012–13

Current squad
The S.S. Lazio squad for 2021–22:

Selected former players

Italian players
Former players who have played for S.S. Lazio and have caps for Italy:

 Bruno Ancillotti
 Valerio Bernabò
 Stefano Barba
 Giuseppe Bigi
 Giulio Bisegni
 Pietro Ceccarelli
 Gerardo Cinti
 Guglielmo Colussi
 Oliviero Fabiani
 Tommaso Fattori
 Alessandro Fusco
 Andrea Lo Cicero
 Gilberto Luchini
 Ivo Mazzucchelli
 Ludovico Nitoglia
 Michele Sepe
 Franco Paganelli
 Sami Panico
 Carlo Pratichetti
 Giulio Rubini
 Francisco Rubio
 Giulio Toniolatti
 Eugenio Vinci (Vinci I)
 Francesco Vinci (Vinci III)
 Pietro Vinci (Vinci IV)
 Paolo Vinci (Vinci II)

Overseas players
Former players who have played for S.S. Lazio and have caps for their respective country:
 Rodrigo Bruno
 John Cootes
 Gary Pearse
 Dick Greenwood
 Zinzan Brooke
– Stephen Bachop
 Carl Manu
 Nick Civetta

References

External links
Official site

Italian rugby union teams
Rugby clubs established in 1927
Rugby union in Rome
S.S. Lazio
Sports clubs in Rome